The Global action plan for influenza vaccines (GAP) was a 10-year initiative launched in 2006 by the World Health Organization with the purpose to increase the global availability and equitable access to influenza vaccines in the event of an influenza pandemic.

References 

Influenza vaccines
World Health Organization